is a bill that would amend the Federal Home Loan Bank Act to treat certain privately insured credit unions as insured depository institutions for purposes of determining eligibility for membership in a federal home loan bank. This change would make such credit unions "eligible for membership in the Federal Home Loan Bank System."

The bill was introduced into the United States House of Representatives during the 113th United States Congress.

Background
A credit union is a member-owned financial cooperative, democratically controlled by its members, and operated for the purpose of promoting thrift, providing credit at competitive rates, and providing other financial services to its members. Many credit unions also provide services intended to support community development or sustainable international development on a local level.

Provisions of the bill
This summary is based largely on the summary provided by the Congressional Research Service, a public domain source. 

The bill would amend the Federal Home Loan Bank Act to treat certain privately insured credit unions as insured depository institutions for purposes of determining eligibility for membership in a federal home loan bank.

The bill would permit a credit union which lacks federal deposit insurance and has applied for membership in a federal home loan bank to be treated as meeting all the eligibility requirements for federal deposit insurance if the supervisor of the chartering state has determined that it meets all federal deposit insurance eligibility requirements.

The bill would deem such a credit union to have met the eligibility criteria for federal home loan bank membership if, six months after its application date, the state supervisor has failed to act upon the application.

The bill would prohibit the application of a state law authorizing a conservator or liquidating agent of a credit union to repudiate contracts to any: (1) extension of credit from a federal home loan bank to a credit union which is a member of that bank, or (2) security interest in the assets of the credit union securing such extension of credit.

The bill would amend the Federal Deposit Insurance Act to require private deposit insurers of credit unions to submit copies of their audit reports within seven days to the National Credit Union Administration and, if the insured credit union is a member of a federal home loan bank, to the Federal Housing Finance Agency.

The bill would require the supervisory agency of each state in which a private deposit insurer insures deposits in a credit union which lacks federal deposit insurance and has become a member of a federal home loan bank to provide the National Credit Union Administration, upon request, the results of any examination and reports which the agency may have in its possession concerning the private deposit insurer.

Procedural history
H.R. 3584 was introduced into the United States House of Representatives on November 21, 2013 by Rep. Steve Stivers (R, OH-15). The bill was referred to the United States House Committee on Financial Services and the United States House Financial Services Subcommittee on Financial Institutions and Consumer Credit. The bill was scheduled to be voted on under suspension of the rules on May 6, 2014.

Debate and discussion
At the committee hearing, Rose Bartolomucci testified on behalf of the Credit Union National Association in favor of the bill. Bartolomucci emphasized that the bill does not guarantee membership to individual credit unions, but only the right to apply for membership. Bartolomucci argued that being able to join the Federal Home Loan Bank System would allow credit unions to better serve their members by providing them with additional liquidity. Bartolomucci also made historical arguments about why credit unions should be eligible.

In the same committee hearing, Thomas N. Richards testified on behalf of the American Bankers Association (ABA) that the ABA has "concerns about privately-insured credit unions being allowed to join a Federal Home Loan Bank." According to Richards, "the issue of concern is the financial viability of the private insurer to a failure of a non-federally-insured credit union that has a significant level of secured advances from the Federal Home Loan Bank."

See also
List of bills in the 113th United States Congress

References

External links

Library of Congress - Thomas H.R. 3584
beta.congress.gov H.R. 3584
GovTrack.us H.R. 3584
OpenCongress.org H.R. 3584
WashingtonWatch.com H.R. 3584

Proposed legislation of the 113th United States Congress
Mortgage industry of the United States